The  TNT Tropang Giga season was the 31st season of the franchise in the Philippine Basketball Association (PBA).

Key dates
March 14: The PBA Season 46 draft was held at the TV5 Media Center in Mandaluyong.

Draft picks

Special draft

Regular draft

Roster

Philippine Cup

Eliminations

Standings

Game log

|-bgcolor=ccffcc
| 1
| July 17
| Terrafirma
| W 86–79
| Jayson Castro (17)
| John Paul Erram (11)
| Pogoy, Reyes (5)
| Ynares Sports Arena
| 1–0
|-bgcolor=ccffcc
| 2
| July 30
| Rain or Shine
| W 79–69
| Pogoy, Rosario (13)
| Troy Rosario (14)
| Jayson Castro (7)
| Ynares Sports Arena
| 2–0

|-bgcolor=ccffcc
| 3
| August 1
| Phoenix
| W 84–80
| Troy Rosario (15)
| Mikey Williams (9)
| Jayson Castro (9)
| Ynares Sports Arena
| 3–0

|-style="background:#ccffcc"
| 4
| September 1
| Blackwater
| W 96–76
| Mikey Williams (16)
| Troy Rosario (11)
| Roger Pogoy (4)
| DHVSU Gym
| 4–0
|-style="background:#ccffcc"
| 5
| September 3
| Meralco
| W 91–76
| Mikey Williams (27)
| Erram, Rosario (9)
| Castro, Rosario, K. Williams, M. Williams (2)
| DHVSU Gym
| 5–0
|-style="background:#ccffcc"
| 6
| September 5
| Magnolia
| W 83–76
| Jayson Castro (17)
| Kelly Williams (15)
| Mikey Williams (5)
| DHVSU Gym
| 6–0
|-style="background:#ffcccc"
| 7
| September 8
| San Miguel
| L 67–83
| Kib Montalbo (13)
| Troy Rosario (7)
| Montalbo, M. Williams (4)
| DHVSU Gym
| 6–1
|-style="background:#ccffcc"
| 8 
| September 10 
| NLEX
| W 100–85 
| Mikey Williams (36) 
| Kelly Williams (9) 
| Kelly Williams (4) 
| DHVSU Gym
| 7–1
|-style="background:#ccffcc"
| 9 
| September 12 
| Barangay Ginebra
| W 88–67 
| Mikey Williams (27)
| Roger Pogoy (8)
| Jayson Castro (5)
| DHVSU Gym
| 8–1
|-style="background:#ccffcc"
| 10
| September 15
| NorthPort
| W 102–92 
| Mikey Williams (29) 
| Ryan Reyes (9) 
| Mikey Williams (5) 
| DHVSU Gym
| 9–1
|-style="background:#ccffcc"
| 11
| September 18
| Alaska
| W 103–85 
| Roger Pogoy (18)
| John Paul Erram (8)
| Mikey Williams (7)
| DHVSU Gym
| 10–1

Playoffs

Bracket

Game log

|-bgcolor=ccffcc
| 1
| September 29
| Barangay Ginebra
| W 84–71
| Roger Pogoy (16) 
| K. Williams, M. Williams (7)
| Reyes, M. Williams (5)
| DHVSU Gym
| 1–0

|-bgcolor=ccffcc
| 1
| October 3
| San Miguel
| W 89–88
| Roger Pogoy (23)
| Mikey Williams (8)
| Castro, M. Williams (6)
| DHVSU Gym
| 1–0
|-bgcolor=ffcccc
| 2
| October 6
| San Miguel
| L 96–98
| Roger Pogoy (21)
| Erram, Marcelo (10)
| Mikey Williams (7)
| DHVSU Gym
| 1–1
|-bgcolor=ccffcc
| 3
| October 8
| San Miguel
| W 115–98
| Roger Pogoy (26)
| John Paul Erram (13)
| Mikey Williams (5)
| DHVSU Gym
| 2–1
|-bgcolor=ffcccc
| 4
| October 10
| San Miguel
| L 90–116
| Jayson Castro (15)
| Dave Marcelo (14)
| Jayson Castro|Castro, Heruela, M. Williams (4)
| DHVSU Gym
| 2–2
|-bgcolor=ccffcc
| 5
| October 13
| San Miguel
| W 110–90
| Jayson Castro (19)
| Troy Rosario (8)
| Jayson Castro (8)
| DHVSU Gym
| 3–2
|-bgcolor=ffcccc
| 6
| October 15
| San Miguel
| L 90–103
| Castro, Reyes (16)
| Troy Rosario (10)
| Mikey Williams (5)
| DHVSU Gym
| 3–3
|-bgcolor=ccffcc
| 7
| October 17
| San Miguel
| W 97–79
| Roger Pogoy (27)
| Troy Rosario (12)
| Mikey Williams (6)
| DHVSU Gym
| 4–3

|-bgcolor=ccffcc
| 1
| October 20
| Magnolia
| W 88–70
| Mikey Williams (21)
| Mikey Williams (10)
| Mikey Williams (5)
| DHVSU Gym
| 1–0
|-bgcolor=ccffcc
| 2
| October 22
| Magnolia
| W 105–93
| Mikey Williams (28)
| John Paul Erram (12)
| Mikey Williams (6)
| DHVSU Gym
| 2–0
|-bgcolor=ffcccc
| 3
| October 24
| Magnolia
| L 98–106
| Mikey Williams (39)
| John Paul Erram (11)
| Brian Heruela (5)
| DHVSU Gym
| 2–1
|-bgcolor=ccffcc
| 4
| October 27
| Magnolia
| W 106–89
| Mikey Williams (26)
| Kelly Williams (7)
| Mikey Williams (7)
| DHVSU Gym
| 3–1
|-bgcolor=ccffcc
| 5
| October 29
| Magnolia
| W 94–79
| Mikey Williams (24)
| John Paul Erram (10)
| Mikey Williams (4)
| DHVSU Gym
| 4–1

Governors' Cup

Eliminations

Standings

Game log

|-bgcolor=ffcccc
| 1
| December 15
| NLEX
| L 100–102
| Kelly Williams (16)
| McKenzie Moore (14)
| McKenzie Moore (9)
| Smart Araneta Coliseum
| 0–1
|-bgcolor=ccffcc
| 2
| December 17
| Alaska
| W 81–77
| Jayson Castro (20)
| Poy Erram (9)
| Jayson Castro (6)
| Smart Araneta Coliseum
| 1–1
|-bgcolor=ffcccc
| 3
| December 22
| Meralco
| L 80–83
| Roger Pogoy (25)
| Poy Erram (13)
| Mikey Williams (4)
| Smart Araneta Coliseum
| 1–2
|-bgcolor=ccffcc
| 4
| December 26
| Rain or Shine
| W 95–92
| Mikey Williams (25)
| Aaron Fuller (10)
| Mikey Williams (6)
| Smart Araneta Coliseum
| 2–2

|-bgcolor=ffcccc
| 5
| February 11, 2022
| Magnolia
| L 93–96
| Aaron Fuller (21)
| Aaron Fuller (11)
| Jayson Castro (8) 
| Smart Araneta Coliseum
| 2–3
|-bgcolor=ffcccc
| 6
| February 13, 2022
| Phoenix
| L 92–93
| Mikey Williams (22)
| Aaron Fuller (23)
| Jayson Castro (7)
| Smart Araneta Coliseum
| 2–4
|-bgcolor=ccffcc
| 7
| February 16, 2022
| San Miguel
| W 96–81
| Mikey Williams (30)
| Aaron Fuller (26)
| Kib Montalbo (5)
| Smart Araneta Coliseum
| 3–4
|-bgcolor=ccffcc
| 8
| February 18, 2022
| Barangay Ginebra
| W 119–92
| Mikey Williams (26)
| Aaron Fuller (14)
| Mikey Williams (5)
| Smart Araneta Coliseum
| 4–4

|-bgcolor=ccffcc
| 9
| March 4, 2022
| Blackwater
| W 106–93
| Mikey Williams (23)
| Aaron Fuller (22)
| Jayson Castro (5) 
| Smart Araneta Coliseum
| 5–4
|-bgcolor=ccffcc
| 10
| March 9, 2022
| Terrafirma
| W 127–107
| Aaron Fuller (24)
| Aaron Fuller (12)
| Castro, M. Williams (6)
| Smart Araneta Coliseum
| 6–4
|-bgcolor=ccffcc
| 11
| March 11, 2022
| NorthPort
| W 106–101 (OT)
| Mikey Williams (28)
| Aaron Fuller (20)
| Mikey Williams (7)
| Smart Araneta Coliseum
| 7–4

Playoffs

Bracket

Game log

|-bgcolor=ffcccc
| 1
| March 16, 2022
| Barangay Ginebra
| L 92–104
| Aaron Fuller (22) 
| Aaron Fuller (19)
| Jayson Castro (5)
| Smart Araneta Coliseum7,091
| 0–1
|-bgcolor=ffcccc
| 2
| March 19, 2022
| Barangay Ginebra
| L 95–115
| Mikey Williams (17) 
| Pogoy, Rosario (5)
| Mikey Williams (6)
| Smart Araneta Coliseum10,486
| 0–2

Transactions

Trades

Pre-season

Mid-season

Recruited imports

References

TNT Tropang Giga seasons
TNT Tropang Giga